Miguel Juan Sebastián Piñera Echenique OMCh (born 1 December 1949) is a Chilean billionaire businessman and politician who served as president of Chile from 2010 to 2014 and again from 2018 to 2022.

The son of a Christian Democratic politician and diplomat, he studied business administration at the Pontifical Catholic University of Chile and economics at Harvard University. As of January 2023, he had an estimated net worth of $2.7 billion, according to Forbes, making him one of the richest people in Chile.

A member of the liberal-conservative National Renewal party, he served as a senator for the East Santiago district from 1990 to 1998, running for the presidency in the 2005 election, which he lost to Michelle Bachelet, and again, successfully, in 2010. As a result, he became Chile's first conservative president to be democratically elected since 1958, and the first to hold the office since the departure of Augusto Pinochet in 1990.

Following the social unrest that erupted in late 2019, Piñera's diminished capacity to govern according to the principle of presidentialism led to claims that Chile is in a state of de facto parliamentarism or should become parliamentarian.

Early life and education 
Piñera is the sixth child of José Piñera Carvallo and Magdalena Echenique Rozas. Among his ancestors on his maternal side is his mother's great-great-grandmother, Luisa Pinto Garmendia, the sister of President Aníbal Pinto Garmendia and daughter of President Francisco Antonio Pinto and Luisa Garmendia Alurralde, who was a descendant of the penultimate Inca emperor, Huayna Capac. He is a nephew of the former oldest living Roman Catholic bishop in the world, Bernardino Piñera, who died in 2020 due to complications from COVID-19.

Piñera's family moved to Belgium one year after his birth and later to New York City, where his father was the Chilean ambassador to the United Nations. Piñera returned to Chile in 1955 and enrolled in the Colegio del Verbo Divino ("Divine Word College"), from which he graduated in 1967.
	 
Piñera then enrolled at the Pontifical Catholic University of Chile, from which he graduated in 1971 with an undergraduate degree in commercial engineering. Upon graduation, he was awarded the Raúl Iver Oxley Prize, which is given to the best overall student in each class.
	 	
Piñera continued on to Harvard University on a partial Fulbright Program for postgraduate studies in economics. During his time at Harvard, Piñera and a classmate coauthored an article, "The Old South's Stake in the Inter-Regional Movement of Slaves", for the Journal of Economic History. After three years at Harvard, Piñera graduated with both a Master of Arts and PhD in Economics.

Career

Teaching 
Piñera was an economics lecturer from 1971 until 1988 at the University of Chile, the Pontifical Catholic University of Chile, and Adolfo Ibáñez University. In 1971, he was in charge of Economic Political Theory in the School of Economics at the University of Chile, and in 1972, at the Valparaiso Business School.

Foundations 
In 1989, with Cecilia Morel, Danica Radic, and Paula Délano, Piñera created the Enterprising Women Foundation (Fundación Mujer Emprende), originally called The House of Youth (La Casa de la Juventud). The foundation aims to assist in the development of young women of lower income.

In 1973, Piñera created the foundation Fundación Futuro, of which he is president and whose directors are Cristián Boza D., María Teresa Chadwick P., Hugo Montes B., Cecilia Morel M., Renato Poblete S.J., and Fabio Valdés C. The head director of the foundation is Magdalena Piñera. The foundation's mission is to help in Chile's development of justice, freedom and democracy. The foundation was renamed Fundación Cultura y Sociedad after Piñera was elected president.

Under the Fundación Cultura y Sociedad (formerly Fundación Futuro), the Grupo Tantauco has the mission of environmentalism, and is administered by Juan Carlos Urquidi. It was created to support the proposals Piñera plans to institute during his presidency. In 2005, Piñera created Tantauco Park (Spanish: Parque Tantauco), a 1,180 km2 (456 sq mi) private natural reserve he bought and owns on the south end of Chiloé Island, in order to protect 118,000 hectares of the region's unique ecosystem. His foundation runs the park, which is open to the public and is an ecotourist location.

In fact, Piñera bought the 118,000 hectares in Chiloé through an offshore company in Panama. He has faced pressure to cede eight hectares to sixteen Indian families whose presence pre-dates Piñera's purchase and who have spent years negotiating to obtain title to their familial lands.

An additional project, Grupo Tantauco: Derechos Humanos, was proposed in hopes of beginning a reconciliation between the Chilean people who suffered human rights violations during Augusto Pinochet's dictatorship.

Businesses 

Piñera was general manager of the Banco de Talca. In 1982, a warrant was issued for his arrest on charges of violating banking law, in an event where over US$38 Million were not paid to the Central Bank of Chile, Piñera being the Banco de Talca's CEO. The money disappeared and was never paid. Piñera spent 24 days in hiding while his brother, José Piñera, appealed the order, making some calls to underestimate the crime. A writ of habeas corpus, first rejected by the Appeals Court but then approved by the Supreme Court, acquitted Piñera.

Piñera once owned 90% of Chilevisión (a terrestrial television channel broadcasting nationwide). He also owned 27% of LAN Airlines (LAN); 13% of Colo-Colo, a football (soccer) club; and other minor stock positions in companies such as Quiñenco, Enersis, and Soquimich.

In July 2007, Piñera was fined approximately US$680,000 by Chile's securities regulator (SVS) for not withdrawing a purchase order after receiving privileged information (an infraction similar to insider trading) of LAN Airlines stock in mid-2006. Later that month, he resigned from the boards of LAN and Quintec.

To avoid a conflict of interest he sold Chilevisión for $160 million in 2010 to Time Warner. He also sold his shares of LAN in several rounds between February and March 2010, as well as his stake in Colo-Colo.

Piñera has built an estimated fortune of $US2.8 billion , according to Forbes magazine. His wealth is greatly due to his involvement in introducing credit cards to Chile in the late 1970s and his subsequent investments, mainly in LAN Airlines stock. Piñera acquired shares of the formerly state-owned company from Scandinavian Airlines in 1994, as part of a joint venture with the Cueto family. The Chilean government responded by stating that The Economist's comment was disrespectful.

Jokes and informal style
Many of Piñera's jokes would, according to diplomat and political scientist Oscar Godoy, be attempts to gain sympathy.

In December 2011, during a state visit to Mexico, a joke made by Piñera where he compared women with politicians caused uproar in Chile, sparking criticism from his own minister Carolina Schmidt who said of the joke that it was "[hurtful] to many women". In the joke, Piñera said that "when a lady says "no" it means maybe, when she says maybe it means yes and when she says yes she is not a lady." The Chilean Network Against Domestic and Sexual Violence called the joke "misogynistic" and "a shame for the whole country". Previously on a state visit to Peru in 2011, Piñera received criticism for his informal style after he revealed to Peruvian president-elect Ollanta Humala that he was a descendant of the Inca Huayna Capac. Senator Jorge Pizarro criticized Piñera's comment to Ollanta Humala, calling for more careful and respectful attitudes.

In June 2013, after visiting President Obama in the White House, he said, "I'm going to sit at the President of the United States' desk," breaking the White House's political protocols. Alfredo Moreno Charme, Minister of Foreign Affairs, said "How many other presidents have done the same?" and Obama responded, "This is the only one," causing laughter between those there. Piñera then justified his abrupt actions by stating his daughter was born in the United States.

Bad luck and ridicule
Piñera has often publicly been associated with bad luck. The BBC has listed a series of situations of "bad luck" concerning Piñera's presidency: the 2010 Maule earthquake followed by another quake during Piñera's inauguration ceremony, the mining accident of 2010, the 2010 Santiago prison fire, the 2011 Puyehue-Cordón Caulle eruption and the 2012 wildfires. His lapses, errors and inconveniences have been labelled "piñericosas" in Chile. Carlos Peña has been deeply critical of Piñera's failed public appearances, calling his improvised visit to Plaza Baquedano, the epicenter of the 2019–2020 protests, in April 2020 an act of "provocation and contempt" and "narcissism bordering on evil".

Chilean impressionist Stefan Kramer has recurrently personified Piñera since at least 2010. This initially caused some displeasure in the Government, which filed a complaint in 2010 to the National Television Council regarding what they saw as a disrespectful portrayal. In 2011, Kramer again personified Piñera, alongside his brother Miguel, in the Teletón charity event while Piñera was present in the public. Judging the situation, journalist Fernando Paulsen said Piñera acted correctly by letting the imitiation pass, while claiming anything else would have been seen as an abuse of authority. Afterwards, organizers were concerned that they put the president in an uncomfortable position, and Kramer chose to not personify Piñera for the 2012 Teletón. However, earlier in 2012, Piñera had been ridiculed again by Kramer in the blockbuster film Stefan versus Kramer. In the movie, Piñera is portrayed as a Machiavellian politician, and is mocked among other things for his real-life impasse with the highly popular football coach Marcelo Bielsa. Some pundits argued, however, that the portrayal may not be merely negative but could have the effect of humanizing him before the public.

José Mujica, president of Uruguay, stated Piñera's low approval ratings might be caused by a lack of "glamour".

Use of bellicose rhetoric 
During the 2019–20 Chilean protests Piñera made himself known for the use of a bellicose language. When Piñera addressed the nation on the evening of 20 October during the height of the unrest he remarked that the country was "at war with a powerful and relentless enemy" and announced that the state of emergency would be extended across much of the country. Some opposition politicians described his rhetoric as "irresponsible", while a Latin America editor for BBC News Online expressed concern about the impact his words would have on the protesters and on the chances for meaningful dialogue. Hours shortly after the President's speech, chief of national defense Javier Iturriaga del Campo appeared to contradict this declaration, asserting that he was "content" and "not at war with anyone".

However, the use of bellicose rhetoric can be traced back to at least 2018 when Piñera began his second government. He has referred to a variety of subjects like drug trafficking, terrorism, and organized crime as "powerful and relentless enemies". Besides this Piñera has made frequent use of words like "battle", "conquest", "defeat" and "combat" in his verbal communication. The use of such language is not unique to Piñera but has also been heard from European right-wing populists and George W. Bush. According to economist Carlos Tromben who studied the political discourse of Piñera, the aim of this rhetoric is to rally the nation behind what is perceived as a common interest, but the success of this has been variable. Tromben also views the bellicose rhetoric as a defensive communicational strategy aimed to gain time for a "counterattack".

Personal life 

Piñera married Cecilia Morel in 1973. They were neighbors in the Avenida Américo Vespucio, Santiago. They have four children, born in 1975, 1978, 1982, and 1984. All of them have university degrees. Piñera is also a member of Washington D.C.-based think tank, the Inter-American Dialogue.

Styles, honours and arms

National honours
  Grand-Master (2010-2014/2018–2022) and Collar of the Order of Bernardo O'Higgins
  Grand-Master (2010-2014/2018–2022) and Collar of the Order of Merit

Foreign honours
  Grand Cross of the Order of Saint Olav, Norway (27 March 2019)
  Collar of the Order of Isabella the Catholic, Spain (4 March 2011)
  Grand Cross with diamonds of the Order of the Sun, Peru (25 November 2010)

Arms

In popular culture 
Actor Bob Gunton portrays Piñera in the 2015 film The 33, directed by Patricia Riggen.

Notes

References

External links

 
  Extended biography by CIDOB Foundation
  Biographical notes, in Spanish
  Genealogy of the Piñera family in Chile

 
1949 births
Living people
Politicians from Santiago
Sebastian
Presidents of Chile
Candidates for President of Chile
Chilean billionaires
Chilean businesspeople
20th-century Chilean economists
Chilean people of Asturian descent
Chilean people of Basque descent
Chilean people of indigenous peoples descent
Chilean people of Spanish descent
Colegio del Verbo Divino alumni
Collars of the Order of Isabella the Catholic
Conservatism in Chile
Harvard University alumni
Mass media owners in Latin America
Members of the Inter-American Dialogue
Members of the Senate of Chile
National Renewal (Chile) politicians
People of Inca royalty descent
People named in the Pandora Papers

Presidents pro tempore of the Community of Latin American and Caribbean States
Pontifical Catholic University of Chile alumni
Fulbright alumni